Manjit is a given name. Notable people with the name include:

 Manjit Dale (born 1965), British businessman
 Manjit Indira (born 1950), Punjabi poet and writer
 Manjit Singh (runner) (born 1989), Indian middle-distance runner
 Manjit Wolstenholme (born 1964), British businesswoman